The following is a list of currently active Professional, Independent Professional, Semi-Professional & Summer Collegiate baseball teams in Canada.  It includes the league(s) they play for, and championships won.

Professional (Major League Baseball)

American League

Professional (Minor League Baseball)

High-A West

Independent Professional

American Association

Frontier League

Semi-Professional

Intercounty Baseball League

Summer Collegiate

Expedition League

Northwoods League

West Coast League 

The Edmonton Riverhawks, Kamloops NorthPaws, and Nanaimo NightOwls	will join the league in 2022.

Western Canadian Baseball League

*currently inactive

See also

List of defunct baseball teams in Canada
Canada national baseball team
List of Major League Baseball players from Canada
Pearson Cup
Washington Nationals, MLB; formerly the Montreal Expos (1969–2004) (National League)
United Baseball League (proposed)
Canadian Baseball Hall of Fame

References

 
Baseball